Eustathes flava is a species of beetle in the family Cerambycidae. It was described by Newman in 1842. It is known from the Philippines and Sulawesi. It contains the varietas Eustathes flava var. femoralis.

References

Astathini
Beetles described in 1842